Class S may refer to:

 Class S (genre), a genre of fiction about girls' relationships, popular in Japan
 Class S, a stellar classification for carbon stars
 Baltimore and Ohio class S, American steam locomotives
 BNCR Class S, Irish steam locomotive
 GNRI Class S, Irish steam locomotive
 South African Class S 0-8-0, steam  locomotives

See also 

 Type S (disambiguation)
 S class (disambiguation)
 S-Type (disambiguation)